Befandriana can refer to several geographical entities on Madagascar:

 Befandriana Nord or Befandriana-Avaratra, a city and commune 
 Befandriana-Nord District
 Befandriana Sud or Befandriana Atsimo, a town and commune